Clifford Michael Sobel (born 1949 in Brooklyn, New York) is an American business executive, financier, Republican fundraiser, U.S. diplomat and former ambassador.

Since 1994, Sobel has been chairman and chief executive officer of SJJ Investment Corp.[3] He is managing partner and founder of the investment firm Valor Capital Group in New York and Brazil.[4][5][6] Sobel is the independent director of Diamond Offshore Drilling, Inc.[7][8]

Career

Sobel was born to a Jewish family in Brooklyn, New York. He first attended the University of Vermont, and in 1972, graduated with honors from New York University's School of Commerce with a bachelor's degree in management. Ambassador Sobel’s career has been noteworthy for its diversity in both the public and private sectors.  He has served as ambassador to the Netherlands and Brazil, spanning both the Bush and Obama administrations.  In the private sector he has been an entrepreneur – manager, as well as president and chairman of a technology company which was listed on the NASDAQ. He has served on NYSE boards and serves on not-for-profit boards.

Today he is managing partner and founder of the investment firm Valor Capital Group in New York and Brazil,]  a growth equity and venture capital investment firm focused on United States and Brazil cross border opportunities.[4][5][6] He is also a partner in Related Brazil, a mixed use developer in Brazil.

He has recently served on the advisory board for SOUTHCOM, the Military Commander for Central and South America, on the Secretary of State’s Foreign Advisory Board (FAPB), the President’s Intelligence Advisory Board (PIAB), and was vice chairman of the Bi-Partisan Federal Commission on Drug Policy for the Western Hemisphere.  He has previously served on the Military Advisory Board for EUCOM and NATO.

Today he serves on the board of the American Frontier Fund (AFF), created to partner with the US Government to advance America’s technology leadership.  He also serves on the board of the Council of the Americas, the Council of American Ambassadors, Christie’s Advisory Board for the Americas, and The Atlantic Council.  He is also a member of the Council of Foreign Relations (CFR), and an Advisor to the Partnership for Central America (PCA).  PCA is the coordinating body for businesses and social enterprises to support innovative, effective and scalable initiatives aimed at economic growth and human development in Central America.

He has served as a board member of Diamond Offshore Drilling (NYSE-DO), Aegon (NYSE – AEG), and  Alpinvest, a fund of funds group based in Amsterdam, NL.  He was Chairman of Net2Phone (NASDAQ-NTOP), a pioneer internet telephony company that went public and controlling interest was acquired by AT&T.

Clifford M. Sobel served as United States Ambassador to the Federative Republic of Brazil from 2006 to 2009. As ambassador, he led the growing partnership between the United States and Brazil by reaching out to the federal, state and municipal governments, the legislature, as well as the business and NGO communities. New bilateral initiatives included the MOU on Biofuels, the CEO Forum, co-chaired by the President’s Office of Brazil and the United States, new aviation agreements, and the re-establishment of senior bilateral military talks. With the American corporate sector, he started Mais Unidos, a corporate social responsibility initiative which brings together over 100 U.S. companies, and a new law enforcement program called Projecto Pontes, which established cooperation between U.S. government law enforcement agencies and federal and local law enforcement officials in Brazil. Ambassador Sobel has received award recognition for contributions to bilateral relations from Brazil’s Ministry of Defense, as well as the State Governments of Minas Gerais, Pernambuco and Sergipe. In May 2009 Ambassador Sobel and the CEO of Petrobras were recognized with the Man of the Year Award by the Brazil-American Chamber.

Ambassador Sobel also served as ambassador to the Netherlands from 2001 to 2005. During that time, he worked with the Netherlands on the first joint European-American conference on 21st century innovation and negotiated a cooperative HIV/AIDS program in Africa. One of the priorities of the Embassy post 9-11, was the implementation of the Trade and Travel Security Program. The Netherlands was the first country to sign the Container Security Initiative with the United States and to implement new travel security programs at its ports and airports. In 2004 he was named the Netherlands’ personality of the year by the Information and Communication Technologies (ICT) sectors for his contribution to the high tech community. In January 2012 Ambassador Sobel was recognized on the 50th Anniversary of the American Chamber in the Netherlands for his accomplishments in Trans-Atlantic relations.

He served on the board of the Wenzhou-Kean University based in Zhejiang Province, China. Prior to becoming U.S. Ambassador, he was chairman of Net2Phone (NASDAQ NTOP), a pioneer internet company that went public in 1999 and was acquired by AT&T in 2000; chairman and president of SJJ Investment Corporation [3] and CMS Realty Company, where he was responsible for investment decisions in a wide variety of areas;  He was president of the Sobel Family Foundation, which contributes to numerous charities, including those supporting children in need.  He was a founder and board member of Norcrown Bank in Roseland, New Jersey.

Sobel is the independent director of Diamond Offshore Drilling, Inc.[7][8]

Presidential appointments

By presidential appointment Sobel served on the United States Holocaust Memorial Council in Washington, D.C., between 1994 and 1998. From 1987 to 1989, he was appointed to the U.S. Government Industry Sector International Trade Board. He was on the advisory boards of Empower America and the Republican Leadership Council, and served on the board and as a member of the policy committee of Business Executives for National Security (BENS). In 1995, he was asked to testify before Congress on fast-track international trade treaties, and from 1993 to 1997, he served as a Secretary of Defense appointment to the board of visitors of the Naval Postgraduate School in Monterey, California.

On July 3, 2001, President George W. Bush nominated Sobel to be the United States Ambassador to the Netherlands. He was sworn in by Secretary of State Colin Powell on November 8, 2001. On December 5, 2001, he presented his credentials to Her Majesty Queen Beatrix. Sobel was the 62nd United States Ambassador to the Netherlands.

On May 23, 2006, President George W. Bush nominated Sobel to be the United States Ambassador to Brazil. On June 29, 2006, his nomination was confirmed by the Senate, and on July 20, 2006, he was sworn in by Secretary of State Condoleezza Rice. He presented his credentials to the Brazilian Foreign Ministry on August 2, 2006. Ambassador Sobel was the 53rd Chief of Mission to Brazil. He resigned as ambassador in August 2009.

President George W. Bush appointed Sobel to serve on the Honorary Delegation to accompany him to Jerusalem for the celebration of the 60th anniversary of the State of Israel in May 2008.

Republican Party work

He was a delegate to the Republican National Conventions in 1996 and in 2000, and served on the Platform Committee and the Sub-Committee on Foreign Policy in 2000. He served as the New Jersey financial chairman of the primary and presidential campaigns for then-Governor George W. Bush. In 1998, he accompanied Governor Bush on a fact-finding mission to Israel. The Sobel Family Foundation, led by wife Barbara Sobel, a Bush 2000 Pioneer and a 2004 Ranger, gave $81,000 to GOP federal candidates and parties in the 2004 elections.

Think tanks

He was on the board of the Lexington Institute. Prior to this he served as chairman of the board of overseers of the Alexis de Tocqueville Institution.

Personal life
Ambassador Sobel and his wife, Barbara, have three children: Scott, Jon and Julie and ten grandchildren. His hobbies include skiing, biking, golf, tennis and art.

Honors and awards
In 1999, Sobel was awarded an honorary degree from Kean University in New Jersey.

References

External links
Profile of Clifford Sobel, Americas Society/Council of the Americas joint website
Valor Capital Group website
Presidential Nomination: Clifford Michael Sobel

1949 births
Living people
Naval Postgraduate School Board of Visitors
Ambassadors of the United States to the Netherlands
New York University Stern School of Business alumni
20th-century American Jews
Ambassadors of the United States to Brazil
New Jersey Republicans
People from Millburn, New Jersey
21st-century American Jews